The Court at 533-549 North Lincoln Avenue is a bungalow court located at 533-549 North Lincoln Avenue in Pasadena, California. The court consists of four bungalows surrounding a central courtyard and driveway. The bungalows have an American Craftsman design and feature gabled roofs with exposed rafter tails, casement windows, and porches supported by Doric columns. T. G. Grabham, the original owner of the court, built the four homes between 1922 and 1925. Architect G. Tombelson designed the first two homes, which were both built in 1922; contractors Whitescarver & Pieton added the third home in 1923, and contractor Joseph G. Roth built the last in 1925.

The court was added to the National Register of Historic Places on November 15, 1994.

References

Bungalow courts
Bungalow architecture in California
Houses in Pasadena, California
Houses completed in 1925
Houses on the National Register of Historic Places in California
Historic districts on the National Register of Historic Places in California
National Register of Historic Places in Pasadena, California
1925 establishments in California
American Craftsman architecture in California